William Rowland may refer to:

 William Rowland (cricketer) (1904–1942), Welsh cricketer
 William Rowland (film director), actor, producer, and director
 William R. Rowland (1846–1926), sheriff of Los Angeles County, California

See also
 William Rowlands (disambiguation)